Behruzabad-e Sofla (also Romanized as Behrūzābād-e Soflá; also known as Behrūzābād) is a village in Qaryah ol Kheyr Rural District, in the Central District of Darab County, Fars Province, Iran. At the 2006 census, its population was 868, in 178 families.

References 

Populated places in Darab County